The 62nd Motor Rifle Division was a motorized infantry division of the Soviet Army. It was originally formed as a mobilization division in 1972 but became a regular division months later. It became a storage base in 1989 and was disbanded in 1994.

History 
The 62nd Motor Rifle Division was activated on 31 January 1972 in Maykop, part of the 12th Army Corps. It was an unmanned mobilization division and its equipment was co-located with the 9th Motor Rifle Division. In May, the division became a regular unit and moved to Itatka, Tomsk Oblast. It became part of the 33rd Army Corps. During the Cold War, the division was maintained at 23% strength as a Cadre High Strength division, in American terms a Category III division. Between 1987 and 1988 future Ministry of Emergency Situations Lieutenant General Viktor Kapkanschikov served as chief of staff of its 1099th Motor Rifle Regiment. On 1 October 1989, it became the 5352nd Weapons and Equipment Storage Base and moved to Omsk. In June 1991, the base became part of the Siberian Military District and was disbanded in 1994.

Composition 
In 1988, the division included the following units.
 1092nd Motor Rifle Regiment 
 1099th Motor Rifle Regiment 
 1100th Motor Rifle Regiment  – equipped with BTR
 107th Tank Regiment 
 619th Artillery Regiment 
 676th Anti-Aircraft Artillery Regiment 
 1258th Separate Missile Battalion
 Separate Anti-Tank Artillery Battalion 
 1263rd Separate Reconnaissance Battalion 
 Separate Engineer-Sapper Battalion 
 1770th Separate Communications Battalion 
 Separate Chemical Defense Company 
 685th Separate Equipment Maintenance and Recovery Battalion
 Separate Medical Battalion 
 Separate Material Supply Battalion

References

Notes

Bibliography 
 

Motor rifle divisions of the Soviet Union
Military units and formations established in 1972
Military units and formations disestablished in 1989